The Triangular Professional Tournament was a professional team match play golf tournament that was played at the Cawder Golf Club from 21 to 23 October 1937. The tournament was contested between Scotland, Ireland and Wales. Scotland won the tournament by winning both their matches. The following year the event was extended to include England and the four teams played for the Llandudno International Golf Trophy.

Format
The tournament was played over three days with each team playing the other two. There were 5 foursomes matches in the morning and 10 singles in the afternoon. All matches were over 18 holes.

Teams
The following played in at least one match:
Scotland: Jimmy Adams (Captain), Willam Anderson, William Davis, Tom Dobson, John Donaldson, John Fallon, Willie Hastings, George Hutton, Bill Laidlaw, Willie Spark
Ireland: Paddy Mahon (Captain), Harry Bradshaw, Joe Carroll, Denis Cassidy, Fred Daly, Bill Kinsella, Joe McCartney, John McKenna, Willie Nolan, Willie O'Brien, Ernie Patterson
Wales: Tom Jones (Captain), Tom Green, Frank Hill, Bert Hodson, Gwyn James, D. C. Jones, Fred Lloyd, Charles Pickett, Dai Rees, Ken Williams

Tom Green had played for England in the 1935 England–Scotland Professional Match.

Results

Matches
Thursday 21 October

Friday 22 October

Saturday 23 October

Final table

References

Team golf tournaments
Golf tournaments in Scotland
Defunct golf tournaments
Sport in East Dunbartonshire
International sports competitions hosted by Scotland
1937 in Scottish sport